Amber is the second studio album by Dutch singer Amber. It was released in 1999 on Tommy Boy Records, and features dance-pop, Hi-NRG, house, and Urban contemporary songs. It is her most well-received album by the American Pop mainstream to date. She co-wrote three songs with songwriters/producers Rick Nowels and Billy Steinberg: "Sexual (Li Da Di)," "Above the Clouds," and "Love One Another." The song "Above the Clouds" was featured in the season 3 finale of the television series Sex and the City.

After the digital release of The Hits Remixed - Extended in June 2022, which contained full length remixes of Amber's hit singles and sparked a renewed interest in her music, Amber entered the Amazon Digital Dance/Pop Albums chart and peaked at  3.

Track listings

 "Above the Clouds"
 "Love One Another"
 "Spiritual Virginity"
 "Object Of Your Desire"
 "Sexual (Li Da Di)"
 "Without You"
 "I Found Myself In You"
 "If I'm Not the One"
 "Let's Do It for Love"
 "Don't Wanna Stop"
 "If You Could Read My Mind"
 "How Can I Tell You"
 "I'm Free"
 "Sexual (Li Da Di)" (Thunderpuss Remix)

Singles 
"Sexual (Li Da Di)", released on 8 June 1999 in the United States and on 12 June 2000 in the United Kingdom, became a pop hit, peaking at No. 42 on the US Billboard Hot 100, No. 70 in Australia, No. 24 in New Zealand, and No. 34 in the UK.
"Above the Clouds"
"Love One Another"

References

External links
 Amber's Official website
 Amber album on Dance-Music-Space.com

1999 albums